Milorad Erkić (17 July 1932 – 10 August 2009), was a Serbian professional basketball coach, player and executive.

Early life and education 
Erkić grew up playing basketball with his hometown team Radnički Kragujevac. After his high school, he moved to Belgrade where he enrolled to the University of Belgrade Faculty of Law in 1951.

Playing career 
On 1 August 1952, Erkić joined Belgrade-based team BSK (later renamed to OKK Beograd). He played under coaches Strahinja Alagić, Borislav Stanković, and Aleksandar Nikolić until his retirement on 1965. On 21 March 1965, he made his last official game in a 119–96 win over Real Madrid. At the time, his teammates were Radivoj Korać, Slobodan Gordić, Miodrag Nikolić, and Trajko Rajković among others. He won four Yugoslav League championships and two Yugoslav Cups.

Post-playing career 
After retirement in 1965, Erkić joined a youth system of OKK Beograd as a coach. He had left coaching two years later as he became a general manager of the club. He was a general manager until early 1990s. Afterwards, Erkić was a youth system coordinator at the club.

Career achievements 
 Yugoslav League champion: 4 (with OKK Beograd: 1958, 1960, 1963, 1964).
 Yugoslav Cup winner: 2 (with OKK Beograd: 1960, 1962)

References

1932 births
2009 deaths
KK Radnički Kragujevac (1950–2004) players
OKK Beograd players
Serbian basketball executives and administrators
Serbian men's basketball coaches
Serbian men's basketball players
Sportspeople from Kragujevac
Yugoslav basketball coaches
Yugoslav men's basketball players
University of Belgrade Faculty of Law alumni